Jim Wagstaff (June 12, 1936 — September 28, 2010) was a safety and coach in the National Football League and the American Football League. He played college football at Idaho State.

Early life and high school
Wagstaff was born and grew up in American Falls, Idaho and attended American Falls High School.

College career
Wagstaff was a member of the Idaho State Bengals for four seasons, joining the team as a walk-on. He played quarterback, halfback and defensive back. He was named All-Rocky Mountain Conference as a senior. Wagstaff was also a four-year member of the Idaho State track team.

Professional career
Wagstaff was selected in the 21st round of the 1958 NFL Draft by the Detroit Lions but was cut during training camp. He took a high school coaching position in Idaho and was invited to Lions camp for a second straight season but was cut a second time after suffering a knee injury. Wagstaff was teaching until was signed by the Chicago Cardinals in November of the 1959 season after the team suffered numerous injuries at the defensive back position and played in two games. He was re-signed by the Cardinals at the end of the season, but was cut on August 1, 1960. 

Shortly after being released by the Cardinals, Wagstaff was signed by the Buffalo Bills of the newly-formed American Football League. Wagstaff was named All-AFL in his first season with the Bills after intercepting six passes and returning one for a touchdown. He intercepted three passes in 1961. Wagstaff retired from playing football after suffering a severe injury during training camp in 1962.

Coaching career and later life
After his playing career ended, Wagstaff earned a masters degree in education from Utah State University. After teaching and coaching football at Pocatello High and then Idaho Falls High, he was hired as the defensive coordinator at Boise State. Wagstaff was hired as the Los Angeles Rams defensive backs coach in 1973. He was hired by the Bills in 1978, where he remained until he was hired away by the San Diego Chargers in 1981. After leaving coaching Wagstaff moved back to Idaho before moving to Kenai, Alaska, where he became the head football coach at Kenai Central High School. Wagstaff died on September 28, 2010.

References

External links
Idaho State Hall of Fame profile

1936 births
2010 deaths
Buffalo Bills players
Detroit Lions players
Chicago Cardinals players
American football safeties
Idaho State Bengals football players
Players of American football from Idaho
Buffalo Bills coaches
Los Angeles Rams coaches
San Diego Chargers coaches
Idaho State Bengals men's track and field athletes
Boise State Broncos football coaches